Recognizable is to be able to recall information from the past.

Recognizable may also refer to:

Recognizable language in calculability, language accepted by Turing Machine
Recognizable set in automata theory, some subset of monoids